The Pittsburgh Harlequins are an American rugby union founded in 1973. The team is a member of the USA Rugby Football Union, the Mid-Atlantic Rugby Football Union, and the Potomac Rugby Union.

 the team had 40 active players, and has had over 300 alumni members since its founding by University of Pittsburgh law students. They advanced to the Final 16 of the National Championships in 1999 and 2004.

The Pittsburgh Harlequins Rugby Football Association was created in 1995 to support the club, its facilities, and rugby youth outreach programs targeting underprivileged youth. In 1997, the RFA bought  of land in Indiana Township, Pennsylvania and constructed two full-sized lighted rugby or soccer pitches with an adjacent parking lot and clubhouse.

The Pittsburgh Harlequins help develop rugby in the Pittsburgh area through youth outreach programs, supporting High School rugby teams, university teams such as the Carnegie Mellon Rugby Football Club and other age-grade all-star teams.

External links
Official Site
Mid-Atlantic Rugby Football Union
Potomac Rugby Union

Rugby in Pittsburgh
1973 establishments in Pennsylvania
American rugby union teams
Rugby clubs established in 1973